Farmington, Nova Scotia could be the following places in Nova Scotia:
 Farmington in Cumberland County
 Farmington in Lunenburg County